Wolinski (alternatively Woliński or Wolinsky) is a Polish surname. Notable people with the surname include:

Dawid Woliński (born 1977), Polish fashion designer
Georges Wolinski (1934–2015), French cartoonist and comics writer; husband of Maryse Wolinski
Hawk Wolinski (born 1948), U.S. keyboardist, songwriter, and record producer
Henryk Woliński (1901–1986), Polish resistance movement member during World War II
Maryse Wolinski (1943-2021), French writer and journalist; widow of Georges Wolinski
Naomi Wolinski (1881–1969), Australian sports activist/administrator and World War II fundraiser
Sidney Wolinsky, Canadian-American film editor

See also
Wolin National Park (Polish: Woliński Park Narodowy) a national park in Poland
Walinski

Polish-language surnames